Raymond Henry "Ray" Baartz (born 6 March 1947) is an Australian former soccer player. He represented Australia 48 times, scoring 18 goals, making him the 8th highest goal scorer of all time.

Baartz was born in Newcastle, New South Wales and spent his early years playing for Adamstown.  At 17 he joined Manchester United and after 6 months signed on a two-year contract.  In 1966 he returned to Australia and transferred to Sydney Hakoah for a then Australian record of £5600. He played 236 club matches scoring 211 goals.

Baartz was selected in the Australian squad to play in the World Cup finals in 1974 but his career was prematurely ended after he was felled by a blow from Uruguay's Luis Garisto in a friendly international fixture at the Sydney Cricket Ground.  The blow to his throat had damaged his carotid artery.

Ray currently still lives in Newcastle.

Awards and recognition 
Baartz was inducted into the Sport Australia Hall of Fame in 1985.

Baartz Terrace in the Sydney suburb of Glenwood is named for him.

On 5 December 2000, Baartz was awarded the Australian Sports Medal for services to soccer.

On 12 July 2012, Baartz was named in the Greatest ever Australian team.

References

External links 
 Oz Football profile
 
 
 

1947 births
Living people
Australian soccer players
Australian expatriate sportspeople in England
Australia international soccer players
Sydney City players
Sportspeople from Newcastle, New South Wales
Recipients of the Australian Sports Medal
Sport Australia Hall of Fame inductees
Manchester United F.C. players
Association football forwards